Garbiele Britz (born 1 October 1968) is a German jurist who is currently serving as a justice of the Federal Constitutional Court and is a professor for Public law and European Union law at the University of Giessen.

On 17 December 2010 she was elected by the Bundesrat on the proposal of the SPD to succeed Christine Hohmann-Dennhardt, who retired from the first Senate in January 2011, as a judge of the Federal Constitutional Court in Karlsruhe. She took up the post on 2 February 2011. Britz is married to Frankfurt local politician Bastian Bergerhoff (Bündnis 90/Die Grünen). They have a son together.

References 

1968 births

Living people
German jurists
Justices of the Federal Constitutional Court

German women judges